Capiz, officially the Province of Capiz (Capiznon/Hiligaynon: Kapuoran sang Capiz), is a province in the Philippines located in the central section of Western Visayas region. Its capital is the city of Roxas. It is located at the northeastern portion of Panay Island, bordering Aklan to the north, Antique to the west, and Iloilo to the south. Capiz faces the Sibuyan Sea to the north.

Capiz is known for the Placuna placenta oyster shell that has the same name locally and is used for decoration and making lampshades, trays, window and doors. Likewise, the province is known as the "Seafood Capital of the Philippines" and was among the top 15 most frequently visited places in the Philippines. Capiz is the site of the famous coral-stone Santa Mónica Church in the town of Panay, home to the largest Catholic Church bell in Asia. The bell was made from 70 sacks of gold and silver coins donated by the townsfolk. Measuring seven feet in diameter, five feet in height and weighing 10,400 kilograms or just over 10 metric tons, the Panay bell is popular among tourists visiting Capiz.

History

During Spanish Colonization 
The account of early Spanish explorers about Capiz and its people was traced back in 1566 when the Spaniards set foot in the mouth of Banica river.

Early settlements were seen in the town of Panay. The town was originally called Bamban. The name was changed by the early Spaniards to Panay, a word which means "mouth of the river." This is also the location of a fortress built by Juan de la Isla  in late 1570. The Paseo de Evangelización 1566 can be found in the town plaza and was erected through the efforts of Rev. Msgr. Benjamin F. Advíncula.

When the Spaniards led by Miguel López de Legazpi came to Panay from Cebu in 1569, after sailing from Mexico, they found people with tattoos, and so they called the island Isla de los Pintados.

How the island itself came to be called Panay is uncertain. The Aeta (Negritos) called it Aninipay, after a plant that abounded in the island. Legend has it that López de Legazpi and his men, in search of food, exclaimed upon the island, pan hay en esta isla! "There is bread in this island"! and the island of Panay closely resembles the shape of a heart and the heart of Jesus Christ is considered present in the Eucharistic Bread. The Spanish then came and established their first settlement on the island at the mouth of the Banica River and called it Panay. This was the second Spanish settlement in the Philippines, following San Miguel, Cebu. Unknown to many, Calle Revolución in Panay is the second oldest street in the Philippines after Calle Colón in Cebu City, Central Visayas.

Later in 1569, Captain Diego de Artieda, who was sent by López de Legazpi, landed in the town of Panay and proclaimed it as the capital of the province. Later, the Spaniards moved the capital to its present site upon founding the town of Capiz (not the province, and now Roxas City) which was near the sea and provided docking facilities.

The province was created a separate encomienda and was later organized into a politico-military unit in 1716. The American takeover of the Philippines resulted in the establishment of a civil government in Capiz on April 15, 1901, by virtue of Act 115.

The Panayanon's noble character and royal blood shone out in later centuries when fellow people from Panay island, at Iloilo City was given by the Queen of Spain, the Royal Title of "Most Loyal and Noble City" for being the most ardent and faithful city in the Spanish Empire and had remained loyal to Spain while the entire empire collapsed.

Although Capiz joined the Tagalog-lead Philippine revolution, the Spaniards didn't surrender to the Tagalogs but they did surrender to the people of Iloilo and eventually Iloilo and Capiz were part of the same Federal Republic of the Visayas a substate which was formed within the First Philippine Republic, the first capital of which was in Cavite while the United States of America had betrayed the Philippine Revolution which they initially supported and influential American officers swore allegiance to. These American officers betrayed their oaths and occupied Manila.

World War II 
On April 16, 1942, Imperial Japanese forces landed on Capiz City and occupied the rest of the province. However, on December 20, 1944, Capizanon guerrillas, whose forces already occupied most of the province, liberated the capital from Japanese hands, leading to the full liberation of the province.

Post-war years 
Capiz and Aklan were united under one province until 25 April 1956, when President Ramon Magsaysay signed into law Republic Act 1414 separating the two entities.

Geography 

Capiz covers a total area of  occupying the northeastern portion of Panay Island, and is one of the five provinces that compose the Western Visayas region. Mount Nangtud, is the highest mountain in Capiz with an elevation of 6,804 ft (2,074 m) located in the Capiz-Antique border. Other peaks are Mount Tigas 4,760 ft (1,451 m), Mount Agudo 2,736 ft (834 m). The province comprises 473 barangays, 16 municipalities and a city. Roxas City, the provincial capital, is only 45 minutes away by plane from Manila and is within the routes of major shipping lines. The Panay River used to be famous for the great number of crocodiles thriving there. Capiz is bounded by the Sibuyan Sea and the Panay, Loctugan and Ivisan rivers.

Administrative divisions 
Capiz comprises 1 city (Roxas) and 16 municipalities, further subdivided into 473 barangays, with 2 congressional districts.

Demographics 

Inhabitants
Historians and ethnologists narrowed down to three types of people known to have inhabited Capiz: Atis/Aetas, popularly known as Negritos; Indonesian descendants of the Mundo tribe in central Panay; and the Malays.

Sulod tribe
Located in Tapaz, Suludnon also known as the Tumandok, Panay-Bukidnon, or Panayanon Sulud, are culturally indigenous Visayan group of people who reside in the Capiz-Lambunao mountainous area and the Antique-Iloilo mountain area of Panay in the Visayan islands of the Philippines. They speak the Igbok language (also known as Ligbok or Sulod language), a member of the West Bisayan subdivision of the Bisayan languages within the Austronesian language family.

Religion
Roman Catholicism remains influential in the lives of most people living in Capiz especially in the fields of politics, education and even in their daily personal decisions. Roman Catholics are predominant with 70 percent adherence, the Iglesia Filipina Independiente has a strong minority with 20 percent while other minorities are Born Again Christians, Iglesia ni Cristo, Methodists, The Church of Jesus Christ of Latter-day Saints, Baptists, Jehovah's Witnesses, and Seventh-day Adventists among others.

Languages
There are two main local languages: Capiznon and Hiligaynon. Filipino and English are also used and understood as administrative and business languages and are widely spoken as second languages. Aklanon is spoken in towns near Aklan such as Sapian, Jamindan, and Mambusao.

Capiznon is concentrated in the province of Capiz in the northeast of Panay. It is a member of the Visayan language family and the people using it are part of the wider Visayan ethnolinguistic group, who constitute the largest Filipino ethnolinguistic group. It is related but often confused with Hiligaynon/Ilonggo, yet it has its own unique vocabulary and accent, as well as a handful of words unique to the language itself.

Government

Provincial Government
The governor serves as the chief executive of the province while the vice governor serves as the presiding officer of the Sangguniang Panlalawigan (lit. 'Provincial Council' popularly known as 'Provincial Board').

The Sangguniang Panlalawigan is composed of ten members (known as 'board members' or 'BM') from the two legislative districts of the province elected through popular vote. They are joined by  three ex-officio members - the presidents of the province's councilors league, Liga ng mga Barangay, and Sangguniang Kabataan.

The term of office of the incumbent officials, except for the ex-officio members of the Sangguniang Panlalawigan, began at noon of June 30, 2022, and will expire at noon of June 30, 2025.

District Representatives

Economy 

With its 80-kilometer coastline and wide expanse of swampy lands easily converted into fishponds, Capiz is dubbed as the "Seafood Capital of the Philippines". It holds one of the richest fishing grounds and is a major contributor in the aquamarine industry of the Philippines. Farming and fishing are the primary sources of income for the people. The combined natural bounty of land and sea sustain a vibrant food industry. Primary agricultural raw products are rice, corn, coconut, sugarcane, banana and cut flower.

Apart from a surplus of agricultural products, Capiz is also a major supplier of prawn and milkfish (bangus). Other agro-industrial harvests include blue marlin, squid, oysters, shrimp, seaweed, and angel wings. Rich fish ponds attract investors to venture into prawn culture, prawn feed manufacture, seaweed farming and the distribution and processing of other marine products. A robust workforce of 445,246 operates with a literacy rate of 92.04%. Its relatively unexplored caves are said to have high deposits of mineral resources such as limestone, gold and metal.

Telecommunications

Four big telecommunication companies offer telegraph, telex and telephone services. Communication facilities are catered by the Philippine Long Distance and Telephone Company (PLDT), Bureau of Telecommunications (BUTEL), PT&T, RCPI-Bayantel, Globelines-Islacom and cellular phone companies: Smart, Globe, Dito, Touch Mobile & Sun Cellular. Internet services are also available like PLDT Vibe.

Broadcast communications

Broadcast media is catered by 4 radio stations namely: AM - DYJJ, DYOW - Bombo Radyo, DYVR - Radio Agong / RMN - FM.-Star FM, Love Radio, and Radyo Todo.
Television facilities reach the city through Iloilo. There are two cable television providers, Wesfardell Cable Services and Filvision, Inc. (Altocable). An ABS-CBN Television relay station is now operating in the city.

Banks

There are more than 60 banking institutions and 116 intermediaries operating in the province.

Capiz products

Some popular Capiz shell chips decorating design include gift items, indoor decoration and outdoor decoration ornaments. Capiz chip-made products range from lanterns, lamp shades, window pane, chandeliers, curtains, picture panels and frames, Capiz shell balls, plates, decorative bowls, candle holders, tiles, flower vase, door hanging chime, soapdish, pendant, globelight, necklace decor, beads, bird cage, floor lamp holders, faux chandelier, gift boxes, collection item rack and many more.

Bulad or dried fish is a major product. There are several varieties of dried fishes that can be found in Capiz.

Business Process Outsourcing

PETRA Academy is a non-voice outsourcing company that serves Korean nationals for an online English tutorial. The company is located in 3/F JC TIU Building, Corner Burgos Street and Inzo Arnaldo, Roxas City.

ePerformax Contact Center and BPO is the largest BPO company in Capiz and Northern Panay, ePerformax Contact Center and BPO - Roxas City opened last June 15, 2018, with over 1,000 employees as of 2020 and is targeting to reach 3,000 employees by 2022. It is located in PEZA-approved 7.4 hectares Pueblo de Panay Technopark inside 769 hectares Pueblo de Panay township. ePerformax Contact Center and BPO has also branches in Metro Manila and Cebu.

Xilium is located in Capiz Government and Business Center. It is a home-grown BPO company from Iloilo City, Philippines. It was founded in 2011 by an Ilongga, Vanessa Belleza and an American partner, Don Wickelgren. The company has grown steadily from a 5-person startup to a full-scale organization with more than 100 employees and a second branch in Roxas City, Capiz. Xilium is hiring Virtual Medical Assistants (VMAs) for US Healthcare Account.

Culture 
Capiz is known for its trademark product, the brilliant Capiz shell,  used in windows, lanterns, decorations, vases, etc. The Capiz shell has a luster similar to mother of pearl shells.

Hymn

The official hymn of Capiz, O, Capiz was adopted in June 2006 by ordinance of the Sangguniang Panlalawigan. Vicente Bermejo, former province governor stated "we need a melody that will inspire us and forge our efforts together to achieve our dream for a better Capiz," in support of the hymn's incorporation.

Folk dances
Capiz is one of the places in the Philippines that contributed a lot in Philippine folk dancing. The province alone has 19 Visayan folk dances such as "Tinolabong", "Gayong-gayong", "Timawa", Dagit-dagit", "Beneracion", "Tatay Meroy Cariñosa", "Pukol", "Habanera Capiceña", "Cabatingan", "Saad", "Pitik Mingaw", "Kuratsa Capiceña", and "Palomita Coquitana" to name a few.

Festivals 

 Saot Capiz – A cultural presentation – The First Capiz Dance Season held every Saturday at the Capiz Provincial Park, Roxas City.
 Sinadya sa Halaran – Is a merging of the Roxas City Fiesta "Sinadya" and the Province celebration of "Halaran". "Sinadya sa Halaran" is a commemoration of the feast of the patroness of Roxas City, which is the Immaculate Conception and a thanksgiving. It literally means "Joy in Sharing and Thanksgiving". Rituals and festivities include fireworks, grand parades, fluvial processions, fair and food festivals, street dancing, and exhibits. Later, the festival was renamed "Sinadya sa Inmaculada Concepcion" with the dissolution of the Halaran Festival and the re-direction of the city's celebration to its patron, the Immaculate Concepcion. The City of Roxas, to celebrate the organization of its government, now also celebrates "Sugilanon Festival" in May of every year, usually in the week leading to or after May 12, which is the charter day of the city.
 Pangahaw Festival – A thanksgiving for a bountiful harvest by the Indigenous Peoples of Jamindan.
 Guyum-Guyuman Festival – "Caguyuman" the old name of Pontevedra, meaning anthill, a name distinct for ants' house was once a part of the municipality of Pan-ay mainly because of its abundant natural resources both from the coastal and upland areas. People from the nearby municipalities of Panay, Panitan, Maayon and President Roxas, would thrive in the market place like swarm of ants for trading. This rich tradition is now a celebration of life and thanksgiving for all Caguyumanons.
 Talahong Festival – Talaba and tahong is very rich in production in these areas. More than a hundred fisherfolk live along the coast. Since Sapian is abundant with seafoods, it was the initiative of the Local Government Unit to organize a Talahong Festival (Talaba-Tahong) every 2nd Friday and 2nd Saturday of May that promotes the local products.
 Tagbuan Festival – It was conceptualized during the Pre-Spanish time, wherein there were aetas in the upland barangay.

Transportation

Air
Roxas Airport is an airport serving the general area of Roxas City, the provincial capital. The airport is classified as a Class 1 principal airport, by the Civil Aviation Authority of the Philippines. Roxas Airport has 3 flights daily and 4 flights on selected days courtesy of Philippine Airlines, Cebu Pacific and Tiger Air Philippines.

Land
The primary transportation vehicle used in Roxas City and other municipalities in Capiz is the tricycle. Travel between municipalities is typically by jeepney, vans and Ceres operated buses. "Capiz Cab", the city's taxi that plies Roxas City and the 16 municipalities of the Capiz. Capiz Cabs are the first receipt-issuing taxis in the Philippines apart from those operating out of Ninoy Aquino International Airport.

Sea
Inter and provincial mobility of residents and their cargo is serviced by vans, buses and jeepneys. Sea transportation (cargo vessel) is served by Moreta Lines plying the route of Roxas to Manila. Roll On-Roll Off (Ro-Ro) are served by two shipping companies namely Super Shuttle Roro 2 and 2GO to fetch passengers from Roxas City to Batangas City via Odiongan, Romblon. 
Inter-island shipping is also served from Roxas City to the following locations such as: Balud, Masbate; Mandaon, Masbate; Sibuyan Island, Romblon; Cadiz, Negros Occidental; Guimaras Island; and Estancia, Iloilo.

Notable people 
This list is only for people born or residing in Capiz.

Politics

 Manuel Roxas, first President of the independent Republic of the Philippines.
 Gerardo Roxas, Philippine Senator and son of President Manuel Roxas.
 Pedro Gil, was a physician, journalist, and legislator. He was elected representative for the south district of Manila on the Democrata party ticket. He became Minority Floor Leader in the House of Representatives of the Philippines.
 Cornelio Villareal, 11th Speaker of the House of Representatives of the Philippines
 Fredenil Castro, former deputy speaker of the House of the Representatives of the Philippines.
 Roy Señeres, Filipino statesman and diplomat.
 Jocelyn Bolante, politician who formerly served as an Undersecretary of the Department of Agriculture of the Philippines.

Entertainment
Jovita Fuentes, Dubbed the First Lady of Philippine Music. The first female recipient of the National Artist Award.
 Daisy Avellana, actress, National Artist of the Philippines for Theater.
Gina Alajar, actress and director. She was born in Lanot, Roxas City, Capiz.
 Barbie Almabis-Honasan, singer, former lead singer of Hungry Young Poets and Barbie's Cradle.
 Mikoy Morales, actor, finalist of Protege: The Battle For The Big Artista Break

Other 
 Josepha Abiertas, feminist and lawyer was born and raised in Capiz.
 Jose Advincula - Filipino Cardinal and the 33rd Archbishop of the Archdiocese of Manila, served as the 3rd Archbishop of the Archdiocese of Capiz and 2nd Bishop of the Diocese of San Carlos.
Jeckster Apinan, a professional basketball player
 Paolo Bediones is a Filipino commercial model, television host, journalist, newscaster and radio announcer
 Eugenio "Toto" Villareal - lawyer, law professor, and former Chairman, Movie and Television Review and Classification Board (MTRCB).

See also
 Capiznon people 
 Capiznon language
 Suludnon people
 Igbok language

References

External links 

 
 
 Capiz Provincial Government Website
 Philippine Standard Geographic Code
 Capiz News

 
Provinces of the Philippines
Provinces of Western Visayas
States and territories established in 1716
1716 establishments in the Philippines